"Kissin' the Wind" is a pop song written by Meredith Brooks, Shelly Peiken and Taylor Rhodes, produced by Craig Porteils for Michala Banas' debut single. The song became Banas's most-successful single release, reaching the top thirty on the Australian ARIA Singles Chart.

Track listing
"Kissin' the Wind" — 3:38
"Kissin' the Wind" (Eargasm dance mix) — 3:45
"Kissin' the Wind" (acoustic remix) — 3:38
"Kissin' the Wind" (music video) — 3:38

Charts

References

2003 singles
Songs written by Taylor Rhodes
Songs written by Shelly Peiken
Songs written by Meredith Brooks